Christopher Nyaole Jafta (born 1959) is a retired judge of the Constitutional Court of South Africa.

Early life
Jafta was born outside Matatiele, now on the border between the Eastern Cape and KwaZulu-Natal, and went to junior and high school there. His father was a builder and his mother a housewife.

Jafta earned a BProc at the University of Transkei in 1983 and began work as a prosecutor for the Transkei government. He was briefly demoted to an administrative position for failing to obey instructions from the security police. He became a magistrate in 1986, completing an LLB part-time, and later returned to his alma mater as a lecturer in constitutional law and commercial law. In 1993 he was admitted as an advocate and practiced in Mthatha.

Judicial career
In 1999, Jafta was appointed a judge of the Transkei Division of the High Court (now the Mthatha seat of the Eastern Cape Division). From 2001 to 2003 he was acting Judge President of the Transkei Division, and in 2003 and 2004 he served in acting positions on the Labour Appeal Court (on the invitation of Ray Zondo) and the Supreme Court of Appeal. In 2004 he was elevated to a permanent position on the Supreme Court of Appeal. Jafta was seen by some as a "rising star". His own view was that his appointment as a judge, and rapid series of promotions, came too early in his career, but was necessary to increase the bench's racial diversity.

Constitutional Court 
In 2007 and 2008 Jafta served as an acting justice of the Constitutional Court, and in 2009 he was permanently appointed (together with Sisi Khampepe, Mogoeng Mogoeng and Johan Froneman) by President Jacob Zuma. He is considered a key member, with Ray Zondo, of the Court's conservative wing.

Some of Jafta's judgments have proved controversial. For example, his judgment in Walele, delivered during his acting stint, has been described by a leading advocate as "awful" and "inexplicable". He is one of the most prolific judges on the Court, with a very high dissent rate, including on points not raised by the parties or his colleagues. His main judgments have sometimes received no support from his colleagues. Jafta's dissent in Rivonia, which received the support of only his staunch ally Ray Zondo and was criticised by commentators, sought to racialise a seemingly innocuous issue and said certain of the Court's previous judgments were not binding. However, his unanimous judgment in Bakgatla-ba-Kgafela, which upheld an appeal by a rural community embroiled in a dispute with its controversial traditional leader, was described as a "crucial" judgment on land rights and land reform and received lavish praise from commentators.

Hlophe controversy 
In 2008, when Jafta was acting in the Constitutional Court, High Court judge John Hlophe allegedly approached Jafta and Bess Nkabinde to persuade them to find for President Jacob Zuma in pending litigation. The Constitutional Court laid a public complaint against Hlophe which Jafta and Nkabinde supported. Six years later, however, when the misconduct enquiry against Hlophe was pending, Jafta and Nkabinde brought a court challenge to the tribunal's jurisdiction, saying their own complaint was not legally valid. Commentators slammed Jafta and Nkabinde's "cowardice", which had brought the Constitutional Court into disrepute. Others said Jafta and Nkabinde's conduct left them "baffled" and confounded expectations about how judges should behave. The two judges claimed, in response, that they were simply upholding the Constitution.

The High Court dismissed the judges' application on 26 September 2014, but they appealed. The Supreme Court of Appeal dismissed that appeal in March 2016, criticising Jafta and Nkabinde's damaging court application and implying that the case raised questions about their "integrity". On 6 April 2016, Jafta and Nkabinde filed an appeal to the Constitutional Court – their own court – asking it to overturn the Supreme Court of Appeal's judgment. They did so partly on the basis that the SCA made "hurtful" imputations about them. All this was despite the fact, as one commentator noted, that the Constitutional Court already held in 2012 that it cannot hear appeals in the Hlophe matter and that any SCA judgment is final. It appeared that Jafta and Nkabinde were "obstructing and delaying the process" of holding Hlophe to account. On 17 May 2016, the Constitutional Court dismissed the two judges' application for leave to appeal, prompting hopes that the misconduct tribunal could finally proceed. However, on 7 June 2016, in a move that "baffled and sent ripples through the legal community", Jafta and Nkabine applied to the Court for a second time, now asking it to rescind its earlier dismissal order on the grounds that it had been granted erroneously. This compounded suspicions that Jafta and Nkabinde were acting on corrupt motives.

Personal life 
Jafta is married and has two children.

References

1959 births
Living people
People from Matatiele Local Municipality
Xhosa people
20th-century South African judges
Judges of the Constitutional Court of South Africa
21st-century South African judges